Eois cogitata is a moth in the family Geometridae. It is found in Colombia.

References

Moths described in 1918
Eois
Moths of South America